The Lovejoy Homestead, near Branscomb, California in Mendocino County, California, was listed on the National Register of Historic Places in 1978.

It is located at end of Wilderness Road, near Branscomb, by the South Fork Eel River.  

The site includes a two-story house known also as the "White House" which is Victorian in style, built originally in 1890.  It is unusual for having a Victorian house in a very remote location. Also included are a barn, a woodshed, ruins of a blacksmith shop, and an apple orchard.

References

National Register of Historic Places in Mendocino County, California
Buildings and structures completed in 1890